The 2016–17 Pittsburgh Penguins season was the 50th season for the National Hockey League ice hockey team that was established on June 5, 1967. The Penguins would win the Stanley Cup championship in back to back years, defeating the Nashville Predators in the 2017 Finals after winning the Stanley Cup in 2016.

Off-season 
On the first day of the 2016 NHL Entry Draft the Pittsburgh Penguins announced they will officially change their uniform colors from Black and Vegas Gold, used from 2002 to 2003 through 2015–16, back to the Black and "Pittsburgh Gold" they have used as an alternate jersey for the past two season revealing a new Visitor jersey reflecting the same format used in the early 1990s.

Pre-season

Game log 

|- style="background:#fcf;"
| 1 || Sept 27 || 7:30 pm || Pittsburgh Penguins || 2–4 || Detroit Red Wings || Joe Louis Arena (16,279) || 0–1–0
|- style="background:#cfc;"
| 2 || Sept 28 || 8:30 pm || Pittsburgh Penguins || 2–0 || Chicago Blackhawks || United Center (20,195) || 1–1–0
|- style="background:#cfc;"
| 3 || Sept 30 || 7:00 pm || Chicago Blackhawks || 0–1 || Pittsburgh Penguins || Consol Energy Center (18,084) || 2–1–0
|- style="background:#cfc;"
| 4 || Oct 2 || 4:00 pm || Pittsburgh Penguins || 2–0 || Columbus Blue Jackets || Nationwide Arena (11,966) || 3–1–0
|- style="background:#fcf;"
| 5 || Oct 5 || 7:00 pm || Detroit Red Wings || 5–2 || Pittsburgh Penguins || PPG Paints Arena (17,848) || 3–2–0
|- style="background:#fcf;"
| 6 || Oct 8 || 4:00 pm || Columbus Blue Jackets || 5–3 || Pittsburgh Penguins || PPG Paints Arena (18,258)|| 3–3–0
|-

|- style="text-align:center;"
| Legend:       = Win       = Loss       = OT/SO Loss

Statistics 
Final
Note – Statistics compiled from Official Game/Event Summaries from NHL.com

Regular season

Game log 

|- style="background:#cfc;"
| 1 || 13 || 7:00 pm || Washington Capitals || 2–3 SO || Pittsburgh Penguins || PPG Paints Arena (18,630) || 1–0–0 || 2
|- style="background:#cfc;"
| 2 || 15 || 7:00 pm || Anaheim Ducks || 2–3 || Pittsburgh Penguins || PPG Paints Arena (18,452) || 2–0–0 || 4 
|- style="background:#ffc;"
| 3 || 17 || 7:00 pm || Colorado Avalanche || 4–3 OT || Pittsburgh Penguins || PPG Paints Arena (18,431) || 2–0–1 || 5
|- style="background:#fcf;"
| 4 || 18 || 7:30 pm || Pittsburgh Penguins || 0–4 || Montreal Canadiens || Bell Centre (21,288) || 2–1–1 || 5 
|- style="background:#cfc;"
| 5 || 20 || 7:00 pm || San Jose Sharks || 2–3 || Pittsburgh Penguins || PPG Paints Arena (18,511) || 3–1–1 || 7
|- style="background:#fcf;"
| 6 || 22 || 8:00 pm || Pittsburgh Penguins || 1–5 || Nashville Predators || Bridgestone Arena (17,113) || 3–2–1 || 7
|- style="background:#cfc;"
| 7 || 25 || 7:00 pm || Florida Panthers || 2–3 || Pittsburgh Penguins || PPG Paints Arena (18,434) || 4–2–1 || 9
|- style="background:#cfc;"
| 8 || 27 || 7:00 pm || New York Islanders || 2–4 || Pittsburgh Penguins || PPG Paints Arena (18,422) || 5–2–1 || 11
|- style="background:#cfc;"
| 9 || 29 || 7:00 pm || Pittsburgh Penguins || 5–4 || Philadelphia Flyers || Wells Fargo Center (19,927) || 6–2–1 || 13
|-

|- style="background:#cfc;"
| 10 || 2 || 10:30 pm || Pittsburgh Penguins || 5–1 || Anaheim Ducks || Honda Center (15,543) || 7–2–1 || 15
|- style="background:#ffc;"
| 11 || 3 || 10:30 pm || Pittsburgh Penguins || 2–3 OT || Los Angeles Kings || Staples Center (18,230) || 7–2–2 || 16
|- style="background:#cfc;"
| 12 || 5 || 10:30 pm || Pittsburgh Penguins || 5–0 || San Jose Sharks || SAP Center at San Jose (17,562) || 8–2–2 || 18
|- style="background:#cfc;"
| 13 || 8 || 7:00 pm || Edmonton Oilers  || 3–4 || Pittsburgh Penguins || PPG Paints Arena (18,576) || 9–2–2 || 20
|- style="background:#fcf;"
| 14 || 10 || 7:00 pm || Minnesota Wild || 4–2 || Pittsburgh Penguins || PPG Paints Arena (18,458) || 9–3–2 || 20
|- style="background:#cfc;"
| 15 || 12 || 7:00 pm || Toronto Maple Leafs || 1–4 || Pittsburgh Penguins || PPG Paints Arena (18,668) || 10–3–2 || 22
|- style="background:#fcf;"
| 16 || 16 || 8:00 pm || Pittsburgh Penguins || 1–7 || Washington Capitals || Verizon Center (18,506) || 10–4–2 || 22
|- style="background:#cfc;"
| 17 || 18 || 7:00 pm || Pittsburgh Penguins || 3–2 OT || New York Islanders || Barclays Center (13,365) || 11–4–2 || 24
|- style="background:#ffc;"
| 18 || 19 || 7:00 pm || Pittsburgh Penguins || 1–2 SO || Buffalo Sabres || First Niagara Center (18,817) || 11–4–3 || 25
|- style="background:#fcf;"
| 19 || 21 || 7:00 pm || New York Rangers || 5–2 || Pittsburgh Penguins || PPG Paints Arena (18,632) || 11–5–3 || 25 
|- style="background:#cfc;"
| 20 || 23 || 7:00 pm || Pittsburgh Penguins || 6–1 || New York Rangers || Madison Square Garden (IV) (18,006) || 12–5–3 || 27
|- style="background:#fcf;"
| 21 || 25 || 4:00 pm || Pittsburgh Penguins || 2–6 || Minnesota Wild || Xcel Energy Center (19,212) || 12–6–3 || 27
|- style="background:#cfc;"
| 22 || 26 || 7:00 pm || New Jersey Devils || 3–4 SO || Pittsburgh Penguins || PPG Paints Arena (18,615) || 13–6–3 || 29 
|- style="background:#fcf;"
| 23 || 30 || 8:00 pm || Pittsburgh Penguins || 3–5 || New York Islanders || Barclays Center (12,149) || 13–7–3 || 29
|-

|- style="background:#cfc;"
| 24 || 1 || 7:00 pm || Dallas Stars || 2–6 || Pittsburgh Penguins || PPG Paints Arena (18,420) || 14–7–3 || 31 
|- style="background:#cfc;"
| 25 || 3 || 7:00 pm || Detroit Red Wings || 3–5 || Pittsburgh Penguins || PPG Paints Arena (18,661) || 15–7–3 || 33 
|- style="background:#cfc;"
| 26 || 5 || 7:00 pm || Ottawa Senators || 5–8 || Pittsburgh Penguins || PPG Paints Arena (18,414) || 16–7–3 || 35 
|- style="background:#cfc;"
| 27 || 8 || 7:30 pm || Pittsburgh Penguins || 5–1 || Florida Panthers || BB&T Center (14,068) || 17–7–3 || 37
|- style="background:#cfc;"
| 28 || 10 || 7:00 pm || Pittsburgh Penguins || 4–3 || Tampa Bay Lightning || Amalie Arena (19,092) || 18–7–3 || 39 
|- style="background:#cfc;"
| 29 || 12 || 7:00 pm || Arizona Coyotes || 0–7 || Pittsburgh Penguins || PPG Paints Arena (18,420) || 19–7–3 || 41 
|- style="background:#cfc;"
| 30 || 14 || 7:30 pm || Boston Bruins || 3–4 OT || Pittsburgh Penguins || PPG Paints Arena (18,415) || 20–7–3 || 43 
|- style="background:#ffc;"
| 31 || 16 || 7:00 pm || Los Angeles Kings || 1–0 OT || Pittsburgh Penguins || PPG Paints Arena (18,544) || 20–7–4 || 44 
|- style="background:#ffc;"
| 32 || 17 || 7:00 pm || Pittsburgh Penguins || 1–2 OT || Toronto Maple Leafs || Air Canada Centre (19,553) || 20–7–5 || 45 
|- style="background:#cfc;"
| 33 || 20 || 7:00 pm || New York Rangers || 2–7 || Pittsburgh Penguins || PPG Paints Arena (18,541) || 21–7–5 || 47 
|- style="background:#fcf;"
| 34 || 22 || 7:00 pm || Pittsburgh Penguins || 1–7 || Columbus Blue Jackets || Nationwide Arena (19,115) || 21–8–5 || 47 
|- style="background:#cfc;"
| 35 || 23 || 7:00 pm || New Jersey Devils || 1–4 || Pittsburgh Penguins || PPG Paints Arena (18,625) || 22–8–5 || 49 
|- style="background:#cfc;"
| 36 || 27 || 7:00 pm || Pittsburgh Penguins || 5–2 || New Jersey Devils || Prudential Center (16,514) || 23–8–5 || 51 
|- style="background:#cfc;"
| 37 || 28 || 7:00 pm || Carolina Hurricanes || 2–3 || Pittsburgh Penguins || PPG Paints Arena (18,653) || 24–8–5 || 53 
|- style="background:#cfc;"
| 38 || 31 || 7:00 pm || Montreal Canadiens || 3–4 OT || Pittsburgh Penguins || PPG Paints Arena (18,633) || 25–8–5 || 55
|-

|- style="background:#cfc;"
| 39 || 8 || 1:00 pm || Tampa Bay Lightning || 2–6 || Pittsburgh Penguins || PPG Paints Arena (18,633) || 26–8–5 || 57
|- style="background:#fcf;"
| 40 || 11 || 8:00 pm || Pittsburgh Penguins || 2–5 || Washington Capitals || Verizon Center (18,506) || 26–9–5 || 57
|- style="background:#fcf;"
| 41 || 12 || 7:30 pm || Pittsburgh Penguins || 1–4 || Ottawa Senators || Canadian Tire Centre (17,769) || 26–10–5 || 57
|- style="background:#fcf;"
| 42 || 14 || 7:00 pm || Pittsburgh Penguins || 3–6 || Detroit Red Wings || Joe Louis Arena (20,027) || 26–11–5 || 57
|- style="background:#cfc;"
| 43 || 16 || 7:00 pm || Washington Capitals || 7–8 OT || Pittsburgh Penguins || PPG Paints Arena (18,653) || 27–11–5 || 59
|- style="background:#cfc;"
| 44 || 18 || 7:30 pm || Pittsburgh Penguins || 4–1 || Montreal Canadiens || Bell Centre (21,288) || 28–11–5 || 61
|- style="background:#cfc;"
| 45 || 20 || 7:00 pm || Pittsburgh Penguins || 7–1 || Carolina Hurricanes || PNC Arena (17,312) || 29–11–5 || 63 
|- style="background:#cfc;"
| 46 || 22 || 3:00 pm || Boston Bruins || 1–5 || Pittsburgh Penguins || PPG Paints Arena (18,506) || 30–11–5 || 65 
|- style="background:#fcf;"
| 47 || 24 || 7:00 pm || St. Louis Blues || 3–0 || Pittsburgh Penguins || PPG Paints Arena (18,563) || 30–12–5 || 65 
|- style="background:#fcf;"
| 48 || 26 || 7:00 pm || Pittsburgh Penguins || 3–4 || Boston Bruins || TD Garden (17,565) || 30–13–5 || 65 
|- style="background:#bbcaff;"
|colspan="2" | 27–29 ||colspan="4" | All-Star Break in Los Angeles || Staples Center ||  ||
|- style="background:#cfc;"
| 49 || 31 || 7:00 pm || Nashville Predators || 2–4 || Pittsburgh Penguins || PPG Paints Arena (18,455) || 31–13–5 || 67
|-

|- style="background:#cfc;"
| 50 || 3 || 7:00 pm || Columbus Blue Jackets || 3–4 OT || Pittsburgh Penguins || PPG Paints Arena (18,649) || 32–13–5 || 69
|- style="background:#cfc;"
| 51 || 4 || 8:00 pm || Pittsburgh Penguins || 4–1 || St. Louis Blues || Scottrade Center (19,496) || 33–13–5 || 71 
|- style="background:#ffc;"
| 52 || 7 || 7:00 pm || Calgary Flames || 3–2 SO || Pittsburgh Penguins || PPG Paints Arena (18,556) || 33–13–6 || 72
|- style="background:#cfc;"
| 53 || 9 || 9:00 pm || Pittsburgh Penguins || 4–1 || Colorado Avalanche || Pepsi Center (16,777) || 34–13–6 || 74 
|- style="background:#ffc;"
| 54 || 11 || 8:00 pm || Pittsburgh Penguins || 3–4 OT || Arizona Coyotes || Gila River Arena (15,879) || 34–13–7 || 75 
|- style="background:#cfc;"
| 55 || 14 || 7:00 pm || Vancouver Canucks || 0–4 || Pittsburgh Penguins || PPG Paints Arena (18,653) || 35–13–7 || 77 
|- style="background:#cfc;"
| 56 || 16 || 7:00 pm || Winnipeg Jets || 3–4 OT || Pittsburgh Penguins || PPG Paints Arena (18,638) || 36–13–7 || 79 
|- style="background:#ffc;"
| 57 || 17 || 7:00 pm || Pittsburgh Penguins || 1–2 OT || Columbus Blue Jackets || Nationwide Arena (19,188) || 36–13–8 || 80 
|- style="background:#fcf;"
| 58 || 19 || 3:00 pm || Detroit Red Wings || 5–2 || Pittsburgh Penguins || PPG Paints Arena (18,664) || 36–14–8 || 80 
|- style="background:#cfc;"
| 59 || 21 || 7:00 pm || Pittsburgh Penguins || 3–1 || Carolina Hurricanes || PNC Arena (12,145) || 37–14–8 || 82 
|- style="background:#cfc;"
| 60 || 25 || 8:00 pm || Philadelphia Flyers || 2–4 || Pittsburgh Penguins || Heinz Field (67,318) || 38–14–8 || 84
|- style="background:#fcf;"
| 61 || 28 || 8:30 pm || Pittsburgh Penguins || 2–3 || Dallas Stars || American Airlines Center (18,235) || 38–15–8 || 84
|-

|- style="background:#fcf;"
| 62 || 1 || 8:00 pm || Pittsburgh Penguins || 1–4 || Chicago Blackhawks || United Center (22,012) || 38–16–8 || 84
|- style="background:#cfc;"
| 63 || 3 || 7:00 pm || Tampa Bay Lightning || 2–5 || Pittsburgh Penguins || PPG Paints Arena (18,640) || 39–16–8 || 86 
|- style="background:#cfc;"
| 64 || 5 || 5:00 pm || Buffalo Sabres || 3–4 || Pittsburgh Penguins || PPG Paints Arena (18,653) || 40–16–8 || 88 
|- style="background:#cfc;"
| 65 || 8 || 8:00 pm || Pittsburgh Penguins || 7–4 || Winnipeg Jets || MTS Centre (15,294) || 41–16–8 || 90 
|- style="background:#cfc;"
| 66 || 10 || 9:00 pm || Pittsburgh Penguins || 3–2 SO || Edmonton Oilers  || Rogers Place (18,347) || 42–16–8 || 92 
|- style="background:#cfc;"
| 67 || 11 || 10:00 pm || Pittsburgh Penguins || 3–0 || Vancouver Canucks || Rogers Arena (18,865) || 43–16–8 || 94 
|- style="background:#ffc;"
| 68 || 13 || 9:00 pm || Pittsburgh Penguins || 3–4 SO || Calgary Flames || Scotiabank Saddledome (19,289) || 43–16–9 || 95 
|- style="background:#fcf;"
| 69 || 15 || 7:30 pm || Pittsburgh Penguins || 0–4 || Philadelphia Flyers || Wells Fargo Center (19,514) || 43–17–9 || 95 
|- style="background:#cfc;"
| 70 || 17 || 7:00 pm || New Jersey Devils || 4–6 || Pittsburgh Penguins || PPG Paints Arena (18,651) || 44–17–9 || 97 
|- style="background:#cfc;"
| 71 || 19 || 1:00 pm || Florida Panthers || 0–4 || Pittsburgh Penguins || PPG Paints Arena (18,653) || 45–17–9 || 99 
|- style="background:#cfc;"
| 72 || 21 || 7:00 pm || Pittsburgh Penguins || 3–1 || Buffalo Sabres || First Niagara Center (18,313) || 46–17–9 || 101
|- style="background:#ffc;"
| 73 || 23 || 7:30 pm || Pittsburgh Penguins || 1–2 SO || Ottawa Senators || Canadian Tire Centre (18,102) || 46–17–10 || 102 
|- style="background:#ffc;"
| 74 || 24 || 7:00 pm || New York Islanders || 4–3 SO || Pittsburgh Penguins || PPG Paints Arena (18,659) || 46–17–11 || 103
|- style="background:#fcf;"
| 75 || 26 || 7:00 pm || Philadelphia Flyers || 6–2 || Pittsburgh Penguins || PPG Paints Arena (18,654) || 46–18–11 || 103 
|- style="background:#fcf;"
| 76 || 29 || 8:00 pm || Chicago Blackhawks || 5–1 || Pittsburgh Penguins || PPG Paints Arena (18,657) || 46–19–11 || 103 
|- style="background:#cfc;"
| 77 || 31 || 7:00 pm || Pittsburgh Penguins || 4–3 SO || New York Rangers || Madison Square Garden (IV) (18,006) || 47–19–11 || 105 
|-

|- style="background:#cfc;"
| 78 || 2 || 5:00 pm || Carolina Hurricanes || 2–3 || Pittsburgh Penguins || PPG Paints Arena (18,631) || 48–19–11 || 107
|- style="background:#cfc;"
| 79 || 4 || 7:00 pm || Columbus Blue Jackets || 1–4 || Pittsburgh Penguins || PPG Paints Arena (18,632) || 49–19–11 || 109 
|- style="background:#cfc;"
| 80 || 6 || 7:00 pm || Pittsburgh Penguins || 7–4 || New Jersey Devils || Prudential Center (14,012) || 50–19–11 || 111 
|- style="background:#fcf;"
| 81 || 8 || 7:00 pm || Pittsburgh Penguins || 3–5 || Toronto Maple Leafs || Air Canada Centre (19,561) || 50–20–11 || 111 
|- style="background:#fcf;"
| 82 || 9 || 7:00 pm || Pittsburgh Penguins || 2–3 || New York Rangers || Madison Square Garden (IV) (18,006) || 50–21–11 || 111 
|-

|- style="text-align:center;"
| Legend:       = Win       = Loss       = OT/SO Loss

Season standings

Detailed records 
Final

Playoffs

Game log 

|- style="background:#cfc;"
| 1 || April 12 || Columbus || 1–3 || Pittsburgh || || Fleury || 18,563 || 1–0 || Recap
|- style="background:#cfc;"
| 2 || April 14 || Columbus || 1–4 || Pittsburgh || || Fleury || 18,622 || 2–0 || Recap
|- style="background:#cfc;"
| 3 || April 16 || Pittsburgh || 5–4 || Columbus || OT || Fleury || 19,092 || 3–0 || Recap
|- style="background:#fcf;"
| 4 || April 18 || Pittsburgh || 4–5 || Columbus || || Fleury || 19,093 || 3–1 || Recap
|- style="background:#cff;"
| 5 || April 20 || Columbus || 2–5 || Pittsburgh || || Fleury || 18,585 || 4–1 || Recap
|-

|- style="background:#cfc;"
| 1 || April 27 || Pittsburgh || 3–2 || Washington || || Fleury || 18,506 || 1–0 || Recap
|- style="background:#cfc;"
| 2 || April 29 || Pittsburgh || 6–2 || Washington || || Fleury || 18,506 || 2–0 || Recap
|- style="background:#fcf;"
| 3 || May 1 || Washington || 3–2 || Pittsburgh || OT || Fleury || 18,625 || 2–1 || Recap
|- style="background:#cfc;"
| 4 || May 3 || Washington || 2–3 || Pittsburgh || || Fleury || 18,617 || 3–1 || Recap
|- style="background:#fcf;"
| 5 || May 6 || Pittsburgh || 2–4 || Washington || || Fleury || 18,506 || 3–2 || Recap
|- style="background:#fcf;"
| 6 || May 8 || Washington || 5–2 || Pittsburgh || || Fleury || 18,594 || 3–3 || Recap
|- style="background:#cff;"
| 7 || May 10 || Pittsburgh || 2–0 || Washington || || Fleury || 18,506 || 4–3 || Recap 
|-

|- style="background:#fcf;"
| 1 || May 13 || Ottawa || 2–1 || Pittsburgh || OT || Fleury || 18,614 || 0–1 || Recap
|- style="background:#cfc;"
| 2 || May 15 || Ottawa || 0–1 || Pittsburgh || || Fleury || 18,610 || 1–1 || Recap
|- style="background:#fcf;"
| 3 || May 17 || Pittsburgh || 1–5 || Ottawa || || Fleury || 18,615 || 1–2 || Recap
|- style="background:#cfc;"
| 4 || May 19 || Pittsburgh || 3–2 || Ottawa || || Murray || 19,145 || 2–2 || Recap 
|- style="background:#cfc;"
| 5 || May 21 || Ottawa || 0–7 || Pittsburgh || || Murray || 18,635 || 3–2 || Recap
|- style="background:#fcf;" 
| 6 || May 23 || Pittsburgh || 1–2 || Ottawa || || Murray || 18,111 || 3–3 || Recap
|- style="background:#cff;"
| 7 || May 25 || Ottawa || 2–3 || Pittsburgh || 2OT || Murray || 18,604 || 4–3 || Recap
|-

|- style="background:#cfc;"
| 1 || May 29 || Nashville || 3–5 || Pittsburgh || || Murray || 18,618 || 1–0 || Recap
|- style="background:#cfc;"
| 2 || May 31 || Nashville || 1–4 || Pittsburgh || || Murray || 18,643 || 2–0 || Recap
|- style="background:#fcf;" 
| 3 || June 3 || Pittsburgh || 1–5 || Nashville || || Murray || 17,283 || 2–1 || Recap
|- style="background:#fcf;"
| 4 || June 5 || Pittsburgh || 1–4 || Nashville || || Murray || 17,260 || 2–2 || Recap
|- style="background:#cfc;"
| 5 || June 8 || Nashville || 0–6 || Pittsburgh || || Murray || 18,605 || 3–2 || Recap
|- style="background:#cff;"
| 6 || June 11 || Pittsburgh || 2–0 || Nashville || || Murray || 17,271 || 4–2 || Recap
|-

|- 
| ''Legend:       = Win       = Loss       = Playoff series win

Statistics
Final

Skaters

 Team Total includes Skater Statistics, Goaltender Statistics and Bench Minor Penalties.

Goaltenders

†Denotes player spent time with another team before joining the Penguins. Statistics reflect time with the Penguins only.
‡Denotes player was traded mid-season. Statistics reflect time with the Penguins only.
Bold/italics denotes franchise record.

Notable achievements

Awards

Milestones

Transactions
The Penguins have been involved in the following transactions during the 2016–17 season:

Trades

Notes
Carolina to retain 50% ($1.25 million) of salary as part of trade.
Tampa Bay to retain 50% ($2.50 million) of salary as part of trade.

Free agents

Waivers

Signings

Other 

Notes
  – Two-way contract
  – Entry-level contract

Draft picks

Below are the Pittsburgh Penguins' selections at the 2016 NHL Entry Draft, held on June 24–25, 2016 at the First Niagara Center in Buffalo, New York.

Draft notes
 The Pittsburgh Penguins first-round pick went to the Toronto Maple Leafs as the result of a July 1, 2015 trade that sent Phil Kessel, Tyler Biggs, Tim Erixon, a 2016 second-round conditional pick and cash to the Penguins in exchange for a Scott Harrington, Kasperi Kapanen, Nick Spaling, 2016 third-round pick and this conditional pick.
Condition(s) – 2016 first-round pick if Penguins qualify for 2016 playoffs, 2017 first-round pick if Penguins qualify for 2017 playoffs, else 2017 second-round pick.
 The Vancouver Canucks second-round pick went to the Pittsburgh Penguins as a result of a July 28, 2015 trade that sent Brandon Sutter and a 2016 third-round pick to the Canucks in exchange for Nick Bonino, Adam Clendening and this pick.
 The Toronto Maple Leafs second-round pick went to the Pittsburgh Penguins as a result of a July 1, 2015 trade that sent Scott Harrington, Kasperi Kapanen, Nick Spaling, a 2016 first-round conditional pick and a 2016 third-round pick to the Maple Leafs in exchange for Phil Kessel, Tyler Biggs, Tim Erixon, cash and this conditional pick.
Condition(s) – 2016 first-round pick if Penguins qualify for 2016 playoffs, 2017 first-round pick if Penguins qualify for 2017 playoffs.
 The Pittsburgh Penguins third-round pick (from Buffalo Sabres via New York Islanders originally Vancouver Canucks) went to the Vancouver Canucks as the result of a July 28, 2015 trade that sent Nick Bonino, Adam Clendening and a 2016 second-round pick to the Penguins in exchange for a Brandon Sutter and this pick.
 The Pittsburgh Penguins third-round pick (originally New Jersey Devils) went to the Toronto Maple Leafs as a result of a July 1, 2015 trade that sent Phil Kessel, Tyler Biggs, Tim Erixon, a 2016 second-round conditional pick and cash to the Penguins in exchange for Scott Harrington, Kasperi Kapanen, Nick Spaling, 2016 first-round conditional pick and this pick.
 The New Jersey Devils third-round pick (originally Detroit Red Wings) went to the Pittsburgh Penguins as a result of a June 25, 2016 trade that sent Beau Bennett to the Devils in exchange for this pick.
 The Pittsburgh Penguins third-round pick went to the Edmonton Oilers as the result of a February 27, 2016 trade that sent Justin Schultz to the Penguins in exchange for this pick.
 The Pittsburgh Penguins seventh-round pick went to the St. Louis Blues as the result of a March 2, 2015 trade that sent Ian Cole to the Penguins in exchange for Robert Bortuzzo and this pick.

References

External links

Pittsburgh
Pittsburgh Penguins season, 2016-17
Pittsburgh Penguins seasons
Pittsburgh Penguins
Pittsburgh Penguins
Eastern Conference (NHL) championship seasons
Pittsburgh
Stanley Cup championship seasons